Markham is a small, unincorporated community in Fauquier County, Virginia, along State Route 55 and off Interstate 66.  It is home to the Naked Mountain Vineyard, its own post office, and ZIP Code of 22643.  The former Manassas Gap Railway (now Norfolk Southern B-Line) runs through the community.

The John Marshall's Leeds Manor Rural Historic District, Markham Historic District, The Hollow, and Morven are listed on the National Register of Historic Places.

Notable people
James Markham Ambler, American naval surgeon
Richard Marshall, born in Markham; Major General in the United States Army during World War II
St. Julien R. Marshall, born in Markham; Brigadier general in the Marine Corps; brother of Richard Marshall

References

Unincorporated communities in Fauquier County, Virginia
Unincorporated communities in Virginia